Sir Edward Crofton, 3rd Baronet (25 May 1687 – 11 November 1739) was an Anglo-Irish politician.

Crofton was the son of Sir Edward Crofton, 2nd Baronet and Katherine St George, daughter of Sir Oliver St George, 1st Baronet. He sat in the Irish House of Commons as the Member of Parliament for Roscommon Borough between 1713 and his death in 1739. In 1733 he was made a member of the Privy Council of Ireland.

He married Mary Nixon, daughter of Anthony Nixon of Dublin, on 4 March 1711 and succeeded to his father's title on 24 November 1729. Upon his death, he was succeeded by his eldest son, Edward. The later Crofton  Baronets were descended from his daughter Catherine, who married Sir Marcus Lowther-Crofton, 1st Baronet.

References

1687 births
1739 deaths
18th-century Anglo-Irish people
Irish MPs 1713–1714
Irish MPs 1715–1727
Irish MPs 1727–1760
Baronets in the Baronetage of Ireland
Edward
Members of the Privy Council of Ireland